Bogorodsky District is an administrative district (raion), one of the forty in Nizhny Novgorod Oblast, Russia. Municipally, it is incorporated as Bogorodsky Municipal District. It is located in the west of the oblast. Its administrative center is the town of Bogorodsk. Population: 65,677 (2010 Census);  The population of Bogorodsk accounts for 54.1% of the district's total population.

History
The district was established in 1929.

References

Notes

Sources

Districts of Nizhny Novgorod Oblast
States and territories established in 1929
